Johnny Jensen (born 17 February 1972 in Sandefjord) is a Norwegian handball player. He played 191 matches and scored 287 goals for the Norway men's national handball team between 1995 and 2009.  He participated at the 2001, 2005, 2007 and 2009 World Men's Handball Championship.

References

External links

1972 births
Living people
Norwegian male handball players